Woodside School may refer to:
 Woodside School, Ooty, Tamil Nadu, India
 Woodside Primary School, Woodside, Aberdeen
 Woodside Priory School, Portola Valley, California, United States
 Woodside Elementary School District, San Francisco Bay Area, California, United States

See also
 Woodside High School (disambiguation)